Powayan  Assembly constituency is  one of the 403 constituencies of the Uttar Pradesh Legislative Assembly,  India. It is a part of the Shahjahanpur district and one of the five assembly constituencies in the Shahjahanpur Lok Sabha constituency. First election in this assembly constituency was held in 1957 after the "DPACO (1956)" (delimitation order) was passed in 1956. After the "Delimitation of Parliamentary and Assembly Constituencies Order" was passed in 2008, the constituency was assigned identification number 134.

Wards  / Areas
Extent  of Powayan Assembly constituency is KCs Khutar, Powayan, Banda, Nahil,  Powayan NP & Khutar NP of Powayan Tehsil.

Members of the Legislative Assembly

17th Vidhan Sabha: 2017 General  Elections

16th Vidhan Sabha: 2012 General  Elections

See also

Tilhar Assembly constituency
Shahjahanpur district
Shahjahanpur Lok Sabha constituency
Sixteenth Legislative Assembly of Uttar Pradesh
Uttar Pradesh Legislative Assembly
Vidhan Bhawan

References

External links
 

Assembly constituencies of Uttar Pradesh
Shahjahanpur district
Constituencies established in 1956